Tamás Kazi (born 16 May 1985) is a Hungarian track and field athlete specialised in middle distance running events. Kazi mainly competes in the 800 metres, in which he participated in the 2009 and 2011 World Championships in Athletics, reaching the semifinal on both occasions. He also competed at the 2012 Summer Olympics in London failing to qualify for the semifinals. He was born in Baja, Hungary.

Competition record

References

1985 births
Living people
Hungarian male middle-distance runners
People from Baja, Hungary
World Athletics Championships athletes for Hungary
Olympic athletes of Hungary
Athletes (track and field) at the 2012 Summer Olympics
Hungarian Athletics Championships winners
Competitors at the 2007 Summer Universiade
Sportspeople from Bács-Kiskun County
21st-century Hungarian people